Thomas Anthony Blanco White QC (19 January 1915 – 12 January 2006) was a British patent  lawyer, and an inductee to the IP Hall of Fame in 2010. He was described in his Times obituary as "the best intellectual property lawyer to have practised in England since Fletcher Moulton" and "cultured, straight-talking lawyer who was without peer on intellectual property issues."

Family
He was the son of the barrister George Rivers Blanco White and his wife, the feminist writer, scholar and campaigner Amber Reeves, daughter of William Pember Reeves and his wife Maud Pember Reeves.  His sister, Margaret Justin Blanco White, was an architect, and through her his brother-in-law was the biologist Conrad Hal Waddington - their daughters, his nieces are the anthropologist Caroline Humphrey and the mathematician Dusa McDuff.

Education and early career
He was educated at University College School and Gresham's School, before going to his father's alma mater Trinity College, Cambridge where he read physics.  He was called to the bar at Lincoln's Inn in 1937, and served with the Royal Air Force Volunteer Reserve from 1940 to 1946 (service No. 80865), working on the then-new field of radar, primarily in India and Ceylon.

Legal career
He became a specialist in intellectual property law. He was made Queen's Counsel in 1969.

Publications
His 1962 textbook Patents for Inventions is regarded as a classic.

Recognition
He was inducted into the IP Hall of Fame in 2010.

An intellectual property library in Delhi has been named for him.

References

External links

Patent attorneys
Members of Lincoln's Inn
1915 births
2006 deaths
People educated at University College School
People educated at Gresham's School
Alumni of Trinity College, Cambridge
20th-century English lawyers
Royal Air Force Volunteer Reserve personnel of World War II
Reeves family